In mathematics, homotopy groups are used in algebraic topology to classify topological spaces. The first and simplest homotopy group is the fundamental group, denoted  which records information about loops in a space.  Intuitively, homotopy groups record information about the basic shape, or holes, of a topological space.

To define the n-th homotopy group, the base-point-preserving maps from an n-dimensional sphere (with base point) into a given space (with base point)  are collected into equivalence classes, called homotopy classes. Two mappings are homotopic if one can be continuously deformed into the other. These homotopy classes form a group, called the n-th homotopy group,  of the given space X with base point. Topological spaces with differing homotopy groups are never equivalent (homeomorphic), but topological spaces that  homeomorphic  have the same homotopy groups.

The notion of homotopy of paths was introduced by Camille Jordan.

Introduction
In modern mathematics it is common to study a category by associating to every object of this category a simpler object that still retains sufficient information about the object of interest. Homotopy groups are such a way of associating groups to topological spaces.

That link between topology and groups lets mathematicians apply insights from group theory to topology. For example, if two topological objects have different homotopy groups, they can not have the same topological structure—a fact that may be difficult to prove using only topological means. For example, the torus is different from the sphere: the torus has a "hole"; the sphere doesn't. However, since continuity (the basic notion of topology) only deals with the local structure, it can be difficult to formally define the obvious global difference. The homotopy groups, however, carry information about the global structure.

As for the example: the first homotopy group of the torus  is

because the universal cover of the torus is the Euclidean plane  mapping to the torus  Here the quotient is in the category of topological spaces, rather than groups or rings. On the other hand, the sphere  satisfies:

because every loop can be contracted to a constant map (see homotopy groups of spheres for this and more complicated examples of homotopy groups). Hence the torus is not homeomorphic to the sphere.

Definition 
In the n-sphere  we choose a base point a. For a space X with base point b, we define  to be the set of homotopy classes of maps

that map the base point a to the base point b. In particular, the equivalence classes are given by homotopies that are constant on the basepoint of the sphere. Equivalently, define  to be the group of homotopy classes of maps  from the n-cube to X that take the boundary of the n-cube to b.

For  the homotopy classes form a group. To define the group operation, recall that in the fundamental group, the product  of two loops  is defined by setting

The idea of composition in the fundamental group is that of traveling the first path and the second in succession, or, equivalently, setting their two domains together. The concept of composition that we want for the n-th homotopy group is the same, except that now the domains that we stick together are cubes, and we must glue them along a face. We therefore define the sum of maps  by the formula

If  then  is abelian. Further, similar to the fundamental group, for a path-connected space any two choices of basepoint give rise to isomorphic 

It is tempting to try to simplify the definition of homotopy groups by omitting the base points, but this does not usually work for spaces that are not simply connected, even for path-connected spaces. The set of homotopy classes of maps from a sphere to a path connected space is not the homotopy group, but is essentially the set of orbits of the fundamental group on the homotopy group, and in general has no natural group structure.

A way out of these difficulties has been found by defining higher homotopy groupoids of filtered spaces and of n-cubes of spaces. These are related to relative homotopy groups and to n-adic homotopy groups respectively. A higher homotopy van Kampen theorem then enables one to derive some new information on homotopy groups and even on homotopy types. For more background and references, see "Higher dimensional group theory" and the references below.

Homotopy groups and holes 
A topological space has a hole with a d-dimensional boundary if-and-only-if it contains a d-dimensional sphere that cannot be shrunk continuously to a single point. This holds if-and-only-if there is a mapping   that is not homotopic to a constant function. This holds if-and-only-if the d-th homotopy group of X is not trivial. In short, X has a hole with a d-dimensional boundary, if-and-only-if .

Long exact sequence of a fibration
Let  be a basepoint-preserving Serre fibration with fiber  that is, a map possessing the homotopy lifting property with respect to CW complexes. Suppose that B is path-connected. Then there is a long exact sequence of homotopy groups

Example: the Hopf fibration. Let B equal  and E equal  Let p be the Hopf fibration, which has fiber  From the long exact sequence

and the fact that  for  we find that  for  In particular, 

When the fibration is the mapping fibre, or dually, the cofibration is the mapping cone, then the resulting exact (or dually, coexact) sequence is given by the Puppe sequence.

Homogeneous spaces and spheres 
There are many realizations of spheres as homogeneous spaces, which provide good tools for computing homotopy groups of Lie groups, and the classification of principal bundles on spaces made out of spheres.

Special orthogonal group 
There is a fibration

giving the long exact sequence

In particular, there is a fibration

whose lower homotopy groups can be computed explicitly. Since  and there is the fibration

we have  for  Using this, and the fact that  which can be computed using the Postnikov system, we have the long exact sequence

Since  we have  Also, the middle row gives  since the connecting map  is trivial. Also, we can know  has two-torsion.

Application to sphere bundles 
Note that any sphere bundle can be constructed from a -vector bundle, which have structure group  since  can have the structure of an oriented Riemannian manifold.

Complex projective space 
There is a fibration

Methods of calculation
Calculation of homotopy groups is in general much more difficult than some of the other homotopy invariants learned in algebraic topology. Unlike the Seifert–van Kampen theorem for the fundamental group and the excision theorem for singular homology and cohomology, there is no simple known way to calculate the homotopy groups of a space by breaking it up into smaller spaces. However, methods developed in the 1980s involving a van Kampen type theorem for higher homotopy groupoids have allowed new calculations on homotopy types and so on homotopy groups. See for a sample result the 2010 paper by Ellis and Mikhailov.

For some spaces, such as tori, all higher homotopy groups (that is, second and higher homotopy groups) are trivial. These are the so-called aspherical spaces. However, despite intense research in calculating the homotopy groups of spheres, even in two dimensions a complete list is not known. To calculate even the fourth homotopy group of  one needs much more advanced techniques than the definitions might suggest. In particular the Serre spectral sequence was constructed for just this purpose.

Certain homotopy groups of n-connected spaces can be calculated by comparison with homology groups via the Hurewicz theorem.

A list of methods for calculating homotopy groups
 The long exact sequence of homotopy groups of a fibration.
 Hurewicz theorem, which has several versions.
 Blakers–Massey theorem, also known as excision for homotopy groups.
 Freudenthal suspension theorem, a corollary of excision for homotopy groups.

Relative homotopy groups

There is also  a useful generalization of homotopy groups,  called relative homotopy groups  for a pair  where A is a subspace of 

The construction is motivated by the observation that for an inclusion  there is an induced map on each homotopy group  which is not in general an injection. Hence, we have the following construction:

These groups are abelian for  but for  form the top group of a crossed module with bottom group 

There is also a long exact sequence of relative homotopy groups that can be obtained via the Puppe sequence:

Related notions
The homotopy groups are fundamental to homotopy theory, which in turn stimulated the development of model categories. It is possible to define abstract homotopy groups for simplicial sets.

Homology groups are similar to homotopy groups in that they can represent "holes" in a topological space. However, homotopy groups are often very complex and hard to compute. In contrast, homology groups are commutative (as are the higher homology groups). Hence, it is sometimes said that "homology is a commutative alternative to homotopy".

See also
Fibration
Hopf fibration
Hopf invariant
Knot theory
Homotopy class
Homotopy groups of spheres
Topological invariant
Homotopy group with coefficients
Pointed set

Notes

References
 Ronald Brown, `Groupoids and crossed objects in algebraic topology', Homology, Homotopy and Applications, 1 (1999) 1–78.
 Ronald Brown, Philip J. Higgins, Rafael Sivera, Nonabelian algebraic topology: filtered spaces, crossed complexes, cubical homotopy groupoids, EMS Tracts in Mathematics Vol. 15, 703 pages, European Math. Society, Zürich, 2011.  
 .
 
 
 .
 
 
 

Homotopy theory

cs:Homotopická grupa